Ophioderma is a genus of brittle stars in the family Ophiodermatiidae.

Species
It includes the following species:
 Ophioderma africanum Stöhr, Weber, Boissin & Chenuil, 2020
 Ophioderma anitae Hotchkiss, 1982
 Ophioderma appressum (Say, 1825)
 Ophioderma besnardi Tommasi, 1970
 Ophioderma brevicaudum Lutken, 1856
 Ophioderma brevispinum (Say, 1825)
 Ophioderma cinereum Muller and Troschel, 1842
 Ophioderma devaneyi Hendler and Miller, 1984
 Ophioderma divae Tommasi, 1970
 Ophioderma elaps Lutken, 1856
 Ophioderma ensiferum hendler and Miller, 1984
 Ophioderma guineense Greeff, 1882
 Ophioderma guttatum Lütken, 1859
 Ophioderma holmesii (Lyman, 1860)
 Ophioderma hybridum Stöhr, Weber, Boissin & Chenuil, 2020
 Ophioderma januarii Lütken, 1856
 Ophioderma longicaudum (Bruzelius, 1805)
 Ophioderma occultum Humara-Gil et al., 2022
 Ophioderma pallidum (Verrill, 1899)
 Ophioderma panamense Lutken, 1856
 Ophioderma pentacanthum H.L. Clark, 1917
 Ophioderma peruanum Pineda-Enriquez, Solis-Marin, Hooker & Laguarda-Figueras, 2013
 Ophioderma phoenium H.L. Clark, 1918
 Ophioderma propiniquum Koehler, 1895
 Ophioderma rubicundum Lutken, 1856
 Ophioderma sodipallaresi Caso, 1985
 Ophioderma squamosissimum Lutken, 1856
 Ophioderma teres (Lyman, 1860)
 Ophioderma tonganum Lutken, 1856
 Ophioderma vansyoci hendler, 1996
 Ophioderma variegatum Lutken, 1856
 Ophioderma wahlbergii Muller and Troschel, 1842
 Ophioderma zibrowii Stöhr, Weber, Boissin & Chenuil, 2020

References

External links

Ophiurida